UK & US Virgin Islands League is an association football competition organized by the US Virgin Islands and the British Virgin Islands. It is played by two islands official team of each nation.

Virgin Islands Championship teams
Saint Croix (US)
Saint Thomas (US)
Tortola (UK)
Virgin Gorda (UK)

Previous winners
1996: Tortola
1997: St. Croix 2-2 Tortola (St Croix won 5-4 on penalties)
1998: St. Croix 2-0 Tortola
1999: unknown
2000: St. Thomas 2-3, 4-0 Virgin Gorda
2001: Tortola 5-0 Virgin Gorda
2002: Virgin Gorda 1-1 Tortola (Virgin Gorda won 5-3 on penalties)
2003: cancelled

References
Virgin Islands Championship, RSSSF.com

Soccer competitions in the United States Virgin Islands
Football competitions in the British Virgin Islands
International association football competitions in the Caribbean